Aleksei (Albert) Dmitryevich Maslennikov (September 9, 1929 – November 30, 2016) was a Russian tenor.

Maslennikov was born in Novocherkassk, Russia.  In 1953 he studied at the Moscow Conservatory and in 1955 became a member of the Bolshoi Theatre where he remained into the late 1990s. His vocal style is often compared to that of the German tenor Gerhard Stolze as both men shared a likeness in singing Sprechgesang. He collaborated with composer Stefania Anatolyevna Zaranek on the operetta Zolotoi Fontan.

Repertoire at the Bolshoi Theatre

Lensky (Evgeny Onegin by Tchaikovsky) – September 2, 1956
Simpleton (Boris Godunov by Mussorgsky) – November 3, 1956
Rudolfo (La Boheme by Puccini) – December 8, 1956
Count Almaviva  (Il barbiere di Siviglia   by G. Rossini) – January 20, 1957
Berendey (Snow Maiden  by Rimsky-Korsakov) – February 12, 1957
Werther (Werther  by Massenet) – July 20, 1957
Mazin (Mother by Khrennikov) – October 26, 1957
Alfredo (La Traviata  by Verdi) – January 9, 1958
Laca Klemeň (Jenufa by Janáček) – December 6, 1958
Otto (Bank Ban by F. Erkel) – May 3, 1959
Vaudemont (Iolanta  by Tchaikovsky) – October 16, 1959
Anatole Kuragin (War and Peace by Prokofiev) – December 15, 1959
Vladimir Igorevich  (Prince Igor  by Alexander Borodin) – January 24, 1960
Kukushkin (The Story of a Real Man  by Prokofiev) – October 8, 1960
Schepin-Rostovsky (Decembrists by Y. Shaporin) – December 26, 1960
Faust (Faust  by Gounod) – February 9, 1961
Duke of Mantua (Rigoletto  by Giuseppe Verdi) – May 3, 1961
Anatoly (The Destiny of a man by I. Dzerzhinsky) – September 30, 1961
Vladimir Gavrilov (Not Only Love  by R. Shchedrin) – March 8, 1962
Fenton (Falstaff  by G. Verdi) – November 17, 1962
Eric (Der Fliegende Holländer  by Richard Wagner) – June 6, 1963
The adjutant of Kutuzov and the voice behind the scenes (War and Peace  by Prokofiev) – October 26, 1963
Guidon (The Tale of Tsar Saltan  by Rimsky-Korsakov) – December 1, 1963
The young actor (October by V. Muradeli) – April 24, 1964
Chekalinsky (The Queen of Spades  by Tchaikovsky) – July 23, 1964
Hindu guest (Sadko by Rimsky-Korsakov) – January 8, 1965
Lysander (Midsummer Night's Dream  by B. Britten) – December 8, 1965
Pinkerton (Madam  Butterfly   by G. Puccini.) – December 1, 1966
Klembovsky (Semyon Kotko by Prokofiev) – April 4, 1970
Finn (Ruslan and Lyudmila  by Glinka) – June 22, 1972
Paolo (Francesca da Rimini  by S. Rachmaninoff) – March 20, 1973
Aleksei (The Gambler  by Prokofiev) – April 7, 1974
Mozart (Mozart and Salieri  by Rimsky-Korsakov) – December 26, 1976
Selifan (Dead Souls by  Shchedrin) – June 7, 1977
Cassio (Otello  by Verdi) – January 24, 1978
Don Giovanni (The Stone Guest by Dargomyzhsky) – April 30, 1978
Golitsyn (Khovanshchina by Mussorgsky) – November 1, 1979
Hermann (The Queen of Spades  by Tchaikovsky) – April 29, 1979
Bedraggled little man (Katerina Ismailova by Shostakovich) – December 25, 1980
Don Jerome (Betrothal in a Monastery  by Prokofiev) – December 26, 1982
Grisha Kuterma (Legend of the Invisible City of Kitezh  by Rimsky-Korsakov) – December 27, 1983

Awards

1955 – II  Prize at the world festival of youth and students in Warsaw
1973 – People's Artist of the RSFSR
1976 – Order of the October Revolution
1977 – Glinka State Prize of the RSFSR (for his performances in the operas "Ruslan and Lyudmila", "Boris Godunov", "War and Peace", "The Gambler").
1999 – Order of Honour

Recordings
 Don Jerome in Sergei Prokofiev's Betrothal in a Monastery
 The pilot Kukushkin in Prokofiev's The Story of a Real Man dir. Mark Ermler. 1961
 Both Shuisky and the Simpleton in Modest Mussorgsky's Boris Godunov dir. Herbert von Karajan.
 Anatole Kuragin in Prokofiev's War and Peace dir. Alexander Melik-Pashayev

References

External links
Betrothal in a Monastery – Guardian website review

1929 births
2016 deaths
Russian operatic tenors
People from Novocherkassk
Soviet male opera singers
Honored Artists of the RSFSR
Moscow Conservatory alumni
People's Artists of the RSFSR
Burials in Troyekurovskoye Cemetery
Recipients of the Order of Honour (Russia)